Zeria loveridgei is a species of solifuges or sun spiders. This species can be found in Somalia and Kenya.

References

  Simon, 1879 : Essai d'une classification des Galéodes, remarques synonymiques et description d'espèces nouvelles ou mal connues. Annales de la Société Entomologique de France, ser. 5, vol. 9, p. 93-154.

Solifugae
Fauna of Kenya
Animals described in 1925